Arianna Lazzarini (born March 6, 1976) is an Italian politician. She was elected to be a deputy to the Parliament of Italy in the 2018 Italian general election for the Legislature XVIII of Italy.

Career
Lazzarini was born on March 6, 1976, in Monselice.

She was elected to the Italian Parliament in the 2018 Italian general election, representing Veneto 2 for the Lega Nord.

References

Living people
1976 births
Lega Nord politicians
Deputies of Legislature XVIII of Italy
Politicians from the Province of Padua
21st-century Italian women politicians
Women members of the Chamber of Deputies (Italy)